Nathaniel Philbrick (born June 11, 1956) is an American author of history, winner of the National Book Award, and finalist for the Pulitzer Prize. His maritime history, In the Heart of the Sea: The Tragedy of the Whaleship Essex, which tells the  true story that inspired Melville's Moby-Dick, won the 2000 National Book Award for Nonfiction and was adapted as a film in 2015.

Personal life

Nathaniel Philbrick was born on June 11, 1956, in Boston, Massachusetts, the son of Marianne (Dennis) and Thomas Philbrick, an English professor. He grew up in Pittsburgh, Pennsylvania and has lived in Nantucket, Massachusetts since 1986.

Philbrick is married to Melissa Douthart Philbrick, former Executive Director of Remain Nantucket. They have two children, Jennie and Ethan. He is a leading authority on the history of the island of Nantucket.

Education

Philbrick attended Linden Elementary School and graduated from Taylor Allderdice High School in Pittsburgh, Pennsylvania. He earned a BA in English from Brown University and an MA in American literature from Duke University where he was a James B. Duke Fellow.  

Philbrick was Brown University’s first Intercollegiate All-American sailor in 1978, the same year he won the Sunfish North Americans in Barrington, Rhode Island.

Career
After graduate school, Philbrick worked for four years as an editor at Sailing World magazine. He then worked as a freelancer for a number of years, during which time he was the primary caregiver for his two children while writing and editing several books about sailing, including The Passionate Sailor, Second Wind, and Yaahting: A Parody. 

In 1986, Philbrick moved to Nantucket with his wife Melissa and their two children. In 1994, he published his first book about the island’s history, Away Off Shore, followed in 1998 by a study of the Nantucket’s native legacy, Abram’s Eyes. He is the founding director of Nantucket’s Egan Maritime Institute and is a research fellow at the Nantucket Historical Association.

Works

Nonfiction 

 Yaahting: A Parody.  1984.
 The Passionate Sailor. Contemporary Press, 1987.
 Away Off Shore: Nantucket Island and Its People, 1602-1890. Penguin, 1993. 
 Abram's Eyes: The Native American Legacy of Nantucket Island. Mill Hill Press, 1998.
Second Wind: A Sunfish Sailor's Odyssey. Mill Hill Press, 1999.
 In the Heart of the Sea: The Tragedy of the Whaleship Essex. Penguin, 1999. 
 Sea of Glory: America's Voyage of Discovery: the U.S. Exploring Expedition, 1838-1842. New York: Viking, 2001.  
 Revenge of the Whale: The True Story of the Whaleship Essex. Putnam Juvenile, 2002.
 Mayflower: A Story of Courage, Community, and War. New York: Viking, 2006.  
 The Mayflower and the Pilgrims' New World: The Story of Plymouth Colony for Young Readers. Putnam Juvenile, 2006.
 The Last Stand: Custer, Sitting Bull, and the Battle of the Little Bighorn. New York: Viking, 2010.  
Why Read Moby Dick? New York: Viking, 2010. 
 Bunker Hill: a City, a Siege, a Revolution. New York: Viking, 2013.  
 Valiant Ambition: George Washington, Benedict Arnold, and the Fate of the American Revolution New York: Viking, 2016.  
 In the Hurricane's Eye: The Genius of George Washington and the Victory at Yorktown, 2018.
 Travels with George: In Search of Washington and His Legacy, New York: Viking, 2021.

Adaptations

In the Heart of the Sea is  the basis of the Warner Bros. motion picture of the same name, directed by Ron Howard and starring Chris Hemsworth, Benjamin Walker, Ben Wishaw, Cillian Murphy, Brendan Gleeson, and Tom Holland, released in December 2015.   The book also inspired a 2001 Dateline special on NBC as well as the 2010 two-hour PBS American Experience film "Into the Deep" by Ric Burns.

Bunker Hill has been optioned by Warner Bros. for feature film adaptation with Ben Affleck attached to direct. In 2016, screenwriter Aaron Stockard (The Town, Gone Baby Gone) was signed to the project.

See also
 Frank Philbrick
 Rodman Philbrick
 Stephen Philbrick

References

Sources

External links

 
 American Merchant Marine Museum
 Little Bighorn, Large Legend, Roger D. McGrath, The Wall Street Journal, 18 June 2010

New York Times interview, Nathaniel Philbrick: By the Book, May 26 2016.

American maritime historians
Writers from Pittsburgh
Brown University alumni
1956 births
Living people
Duke University alumni
National Book Award winners
American male non-fiction writers
Taylor Allderdice High School alumni
Historians from Pennsylvania
Philbrick family